The Canterbury Tales is a 14th-century English collection of stories, mainly in verse, written by Geoffrey Chaucer.

The Canterbury Tales may also refer to the following, which are directly or loosely derived from Chaucer's work:

 A Canterbury Tale, a 1944 British film made by Powell & Pressburger
 Canterbury Tales - Musical, a 1968 British production
 The Best of Caravan - Canterbury Tales, a compilation album by Caravan
 The Canterbury Tales (film) (English title), a 1972 Italian film directed by Pier Paolo Pasolini as I racconti di Canterbury (Italian title)
 The Canterbury Tales (1998-2000), animated TV series nominated for the Academy Award for Animated Short Film in 1998
 Canterbury Tales (1969 TV series), shown by the BBC in 1969
 The Canterbury Tales (TV series), shown by the BBC in 2003
 Canterbury Tales (tour), a physical theatre piece devised by Icon Theatre in 2003
 The Canterbury Tales (attraction), a 14th-century medieval living history attraction in Canterbury, Kent
 Canterbury Tales, a 1797-1805 collection of short stories and novellas by Harriet Lee and Sophia Lee.